Rulffs is a Germanic surname. Notable people with the surname include:

Bøicke Johan Rulffs Koren (1828–1909), Norwegian Minister of the Navy 
Manfred Rulffs (1935–2007), German rower

Germanic-language surnames